The 1997–98 FAW Premier Cup was the inaugural season of the tournament.

Group stage

Group A

Group B

Quarter finals

Semi finals

First leg

Second leg

Final

See also
1997–98 in Welsh football

References

External links
FAW Premier Cup 1997/8

1997-98
1997–98 in Welsh football cups